Baker's is a supermarket chain operating primarily in the metro area of Omaha, Nebraska. It is owned by Kroger. Baker's supermarket has an annual revenue of $325,000,000.

History
Abraham Baker opened his first grocery store in Walnut, Iowa in 1927. His first Omaha-area store opened in Bellevue, Nebraska in 1947, and his first in Omaha itself at 73rd and Maple Streets opened in 1957.

In 1971, Abraham's two sons, Jack and Bob, took on more management responsibility.  In 1972, The Jewel Companies, Inc. made a deal with Baker's to open a Turn Style/Baker's Family Center in Omaha. As revenues began to decline, The Baker family sold the chain to food wholesaler Fleming Companies, Inc in 1992. The Kroger Company purchased the Baker's stores from Fleming in 2001, after Fleming ran into financial problems.

In 2004, three former Albertsons supermarkets in Omaha were purchased and turned into Baker's stores after Albertsons withdrew from the Omaha market. Baker's today is run under the Dillons division, which includes Baker's, Dillons, and Gerbes.

References

 "Baker's to Open Three Stores," Progressivegrocer.com, August 27, 2004
 "Grocery Giant Got Its Start With Family," Omaha World-Herald. December 15, 2000

External links

Kroger
1927 establishments in Iowa
Companies based in Omaha, Nebraska
Retail companies established in 1927
Retailing in Omaha, Nebraska
Supermarkets of the United States
American companies established in 1927